Santa Ana Nextlalplan is a town of Nextlalpan municipality in Mexico State in Mexico.

References

Populated places in the State of Mexico
Nextlalpan
Municipality seats in the State of Mexico